William Martin was a Scottish professional footballer who made over 170 appearances in the Scottish League for as a centre forward for Queen's Park and Clyde. In representative football, he was capped by Scotland Amateurs and the Scottish League XI.

Personal life 
Martin attended Queen's Park Secondary School.

Career statistics

Honours 

Clyde
 Scottish Cup: 1938–39
 Paisley Charity Cup: 1939, 1940

Scotland Amateurs
 British Amateur Championship: 1935–36, 1936–37

References

Scottish footballers
Scottish Football League players
Queen's Park F.C. players
Place of death missing
Date of death missing
Year of birth missing
Place of birth missing
Association football forwards
Scotland amateur international footballers
Clyde F.C. players
Scottish Football League representative players
People educated at Queen's Park Secondary School